Wilfred M. McClay (born 1951) is an American academic currently on the faculty of Hillsdale College.

Early life and education
McClay graduated from St. John's College, and received a Ph.D. in history from Johns Hopkins University in 1987.

Career
McClay taught at Georgetown, Tulane, Johns Hopkins, and the University of Dallas before moving to the University of Tennessee at Chattanooga in 1999, where he held the SunTrust Bank Chair of Excellence in Humanities.

McClay is a Senior Scholar at the Woodrow Wilson International Center for Scholars, a Senior Fellow at the Ethics and Public Policy Center and at The Trinity Forum, a member of the Philadelphia Society, and a member of the Society of Scholars at the James Madison Program in American Ideals and Institutions of Princeton University. From 2002 through 2012, he served on the National Council on the Humanities, the advisory board for the National Endowment for the Humanities. He is the President of the Philadelphia Society for the year 2021-2022.

McClay serves on the Board of Visitors of Ralston College and on the editorial/advisory boards of The Wilson Quarterly, First Things, Society, Historically Speaking, The University Bookman, The New Atlantis, and The City.

Awards
 1995 Merle Curti Award
 1997-98 Templeton Honor Rolls
 Woodrow Wilson International Center for Scholars
 National Endowment for the Humanities Fellowship
 National Academy of Education Fellowship
 Howard Foundation Fellowship
 Earhart Foundation Fellowship
 Danforth Foundation Fellowship

Works
 Land of Hope: An Invitation to the Great American Story Encounter Books 2019
 "The Strange Persistence of Guilt" The Hedgehog Review Spring, 2017
 Why Place Matters: Geography, Identity, and Civic Life in Modern America. New Atlantis/Encounter Books. 2014. 
 "Obama’s Middle Eastern Policy and the 2012 Election" The Jerusalem Review November 1, 2012
 "Whig History At Eighty: The Enduring Relevance of Herbert Butterfield and His Most Famous Book" First Things March 2011
 "Keeping Time" First Things June/July 2009
 The Soul and the City The City Summer 2009
 "Mediating Institutions" First Things April 2009
 "Uncomfortable Belief" First Things May 2008
 "Beyond the Right to Life" The New Atlantis, Number 14, Fall 2006
 The Federal Idea Address to the Philadelphia Society, November 1996
 "The Continuing Irony of American History" First Things February 2002
 "The Christian Historian and the Idea of Progress" in 
 
 
 
 Figures in the Carpet: Finding the Human Person in the American Past, editor, Eerdmans, 2007

References

External links

Hillsdale College faculty
Johns Hopkins University alumni
Georgetown University faculty
Tulane University faculty
Johns Hopkins University faculty
University of Dallas faculty
University of Oklahoma faculty
University of Tennessee at Chattanooga faculty
St. John's College (Annapolis/Santa Fe) alumni
Princeton University people
Living people
21st-century American historians
21st-century American male writers
Earhart Foundation Fellows
American male non-fiction writers
1951 births